Mikhail Elgin and Divij Sharan were the defending champions but chose not to defend their title.

Max Purcell and Luke Saville won the title after defeating Purav Raja and Antonio Šančić 7–6(7–3), 6–3 in the final.

Seeds

Draw

References
 Main Draw

Bengaluru Open - Doubles
2018 Doubles